Oyebanji Filani is a Nigerian physician and health economist. He is the Ekiti State commissioner of Health and Human Services.

Education 
He is a graduate of the College of Medicine, University of Lagos and he also has a degree in Health Economics and Health Policy from the University of Birmingham.

References 

Living people
Ekiti State
Ekiti State politicians
University of Lagos alumni
Year of birth missing (living people)